The sedimentation coefficient of a particle characterizes its sedimentation during centrifugation. It is defined as the ratio of a particle's sedimentation velocity to the applied acceleration causing the sedimentation.
 

The sedimentation speed  is also the terminal velocity. It is constant because the force applied to a particle by gravity or by a centrifuge (typically in multiples of tens of thousands of gravities in an ultracentrifuge) is balanced by the viscous resistance (or "drag") of the fluid (normally water) through which the particle is moving. The applied acceleration  can be either the gravitational acceleration , or more commonly the centrifugal acceleration .

Stokes' law applies to small spheres in an infinite amount of fluid at the small Reynolds Number limit.

When the two opposing forces, viscous and centrifugal, balance, the particle moves at constant (terminal) velocity. The terminal velocity for a spherical particle is given by the equation:

 

Rearranging this equation gives the final formula:

 

The sedimentation coefficient has units of time,  expressed in svedbergs. One svedberg is 10−13 s. The sedimentation coefficient normalizes the sedimentation rate of a particle to its applied acceleration. The result no longer depends on acceleration, but only on the properties of the particle and the fluid in which it is suspended. Sedimentation coefficients quoted in literature usually pertain to sedimentation in water at 20 °C.

The sedimentation coefficient is in fact the amount of time it would take the particle to reach its terminal velocity under the given acceleration if there were no drag.

Sedimentation coefficients are, however, not additive. When two particles bind together, the shape will be different from the shapes of the original particles. Even if the shape were the same, the ratio of excess mass to size would not be equal to the sum of the ratios for the starting particles. Thus, when measured separately they have svedberg values that do not add up to that of the bound particle. For example ribosomes are typically identified by their sedimentation coefficient. The 70 S ribosome from bacteria has a sedimentation coefficient of 70 svedberg, although it is composed of a 50 S subunit and a 30 S subunit.

See also
 Clearing factor
 Svedberg
 Sedimentation
 Centrifugation

External links
 An article on sedimentation velocity Alliance Protein Laboratories (A division of KBI Biopharma) Archived: 2022-01-16  Retrieved:2022-09-17
 Modern Analytical Ultracentrifugation in Protein Science: A tutorial review

Laboratory techniques
Unit operations